Annunciation is a 1603-1605 painting by El Greco, produced as part of a contract to provide paintings for a church in Illescas, Toledo. 
The painting still hangs in the church, the Santuario de Nuestra Señora de la Caridad, with three others from the same set (Charity, Coronation of the Virgin and Nativity), whilst the fifth is now in the National Museum of Art of Romania (Marriage of the Virgin).

It is a simplification of the composition used by the artist for the Annunciation on the Doña María de Aragón Altarpiece.

1600s paintings
El Greco
Paintings by El Greco
Books in art
Altarpieces